Pritzwalk is a town in the district of Prignitz, in Brandenburg, Germany. It is situated 20 km west of Wittstock, and 33 km northeast of Wittenberge. The river Dömnitz flows through Pritzwalk.

History 
Pritzwalk obtained municipal status in 1256. Nearly all the buildings in the town centre were destroyed by a fire in 1821. The Town Hall was built in a classicist style 1829. On 15th March 1945 many houses around the railway station were destroyed by a heavy explosion during an air raid when a munition train exploded after it had been hit by bombs. In the fifties many new residential buildings were erected.

Sights  
Saint Nikolai Church was founded around 1250. In 1451 it was enlarged and transformed into a large gothic hall church. During the fire which destroyed most of the town in 1821 the church was heavily damaged. It was rebuilt in built in a neogothic style at the end of the 19th century. Its tower dating from 1882 has a height of 72 metres. The Town Hall was built in a classicist style 1829.

After the fire many houses were rebuilt in a traditional style. Several streets are worth a visit, e.g. Schützenstraße with its half-timbered houses. Many houses built in Art nouveau or Gründerzeit style as well as buildings dating from the fifties were renovated after the reunification of Germany, e.g. in Hagenstraße. The Railway Station dates from 1955. The former railway station had been destroyed by a heavy explosion following an air raid in 1945.

The old town centre is surrounded by parks and meadows which are remnants of a medieval defense system of moats and mounds. A part of the medieval wall is left with a shottower in the northeast of the centre.

Many villages which were incorporated into Pritzwalk have old village churches worth a visit, e.g. Sarnow.

Demography

International relations

Twin towns — Sister cities
Pritzwalk is twinned with:

  Winsen, Germany

Sons and daughters of the town
 Heinrich Gätke (1814–1897), ornithologist

 Hermann von Grauert (1850–1924), historian
 Franz John (1872–1952), first president of FC Bayern München
 Günther Quandt (1881–1954), industrial and Wehrwirtschaftsführer

 Ernst-Günther Baade (1897–1945), Generalleutnant of the Wehrmacht, 
 Herbert Quandt (1910–1982), industrial
 Liane Buhr (born 1956), rower

References

External links

Localities in Prignitz
Members of the Hanseatic League